The golden grass mabuya or southern grass skink (Heremites septemtaeniatus) is a species of skink found in the Middle East.

References

Heremites
Reptiles described in 1834
Taxa named by Adolph Reuss